Hans Paetsch (7 December 1909 – 3 February 2002) was a German actor. He appeared in 52 films between 1939 and 2002. He is most notable for his voice acting, especially as a narrator of fairy tales and audio dramas.

Selected filmography

 Silvesternacht am Alexanderplatz (1939) - Rudi Lingenfelder
 Mein Mann darf es nicht wissen (1940) - Fritz Korn
 Blutsbrüderschaft (1941) - Kommunist
 Happiness is the Main Thing (1941) - Unverheiratetet Kollege (uncredited)
 Kameraden (1941) - Leutnant von Flemming
 Ein Zug fährt ab (1942) - Journalist Dr. Teßmer
 Fünftausend Mark Belohnung (1942) - Dr. Fritz Vogt
 Sieben Briefe (1944) - Kriminalkommissar (uncredited)
 Insolent and in Love (1948) - Ober
 Das Gesetz der Liebe (1949) - Junker Graf Oynhausen
 The Lie (1950)
 Made in Germany (1957) - Der Großherzog
 The Heart of St. Pauli (1957) - Käpt'n Martens
 The Man Who Sold Himself (1959) - Steinmaker
 Stalingrad: Dogs, Do You Want to Live Forever? (1959) - Biologe
 Of Course, the Motorists (1959) - Polizeipräsident
 The Blue Moth (1959) - Richter
 The Buddenbrooks (1959) - Arnoldsen
 The Woman by the Dark Window (1960) - Dr. Mertens
 Yes, Women are Dangerous (1960) - William Bancroft
 Im Namen einer Mutter (1960) - Vorsitzender
 The Ambassador (1960)
 Fabrik der Offiziere (1960)
 The Dead Eyes of London (1961) - Gordon Stuart
 Mörderspiel (1961) - Kriminalkommissar Ullmann
 Barbara (1961) - Inselvogt Harme
 The Puzzle of the Red Orchid (1962) - Lord Arlington
 The Inn on the River (1962) - Rechtsanwalt
 Durchbruch Lok 234 (1963) - Professor Pollnow
 Teufel im Fleisch (1964) - Mann (narrator, uncredited)
 Waiting Room to the Beyond (1964) - Sir Cyrus Bradley
 Sir Roger Casement (1968, TV Series) - Edward Grey
 Maximilian von Mexiko (1970, TV Series) - Papst Pius IX.
 Das Erbe der Guldenburgs (1987-1990, TV Series) - Dr. Hollander
  (1990, TV Movie) - Horst Sindermann
 Das serbische Mädchen (1991)
 The Magic Voyage (1992) - Narrator (German version, narrator)
 Otto Waalkes in Otto - Der Liebesfilm (1992) - Gott (narrator, uncredited)
 Sommer der Liebe (1992) - Erzähler (narrator)
 Sieben Monde (1998) - Präparator / Preparator
 Run Lola Run (1998) - Erzähler (narrator, uncredited)
 Hui Buh: Das Schlossgespenst (2006) - Narrator (uncredited) (final film role)

References

External links

1909 births
2002 deaths
German male film actors
German male television actors
German male voice actors
20th-century German male actors